Barbu Știrbei National College is a high school located at 159 București Street, Călărași, Romania.

In 1864, the sum of 20 thousand lei was allocated for the building of a new school in Călărași. The amount was paid repeatedly, but went to other uses until 1881, when the cornerstone was laid. The building was ready in 1884, when a real gymnasium was inaugurated. The institution soon acquired prestige, and in 1894 was named after Prince Barbu Dimitrie Știrbei upon the initiative of faculty members.

In 1919, the former gymnasium became a high school. A dormitory housing 70 pupils was opened in 1940. Girls were first admitted in 1956; the following year, the school was renamed after Nicolae Bălcescu. A new building opened in 1962. The Știrbei name was restored in 1992, following the Romanian Revolution. In 1999, the school was declared a national college.

The old school building is listed as a historic monument by Romania's Ministry of Culture and Religious Affairs.

Notes

External links
 Official site

Historic monuments in Călărași County
Călărași
Schools in Călărași County
Educational institutions established in 1884
1884 establishments in Romania
National Colleges in Romania
School buildings completed in 1884